Septimanie d'Egmont (née Jeanne Louise Armande Élisabeth Sophie Septimanie de Vignerot du Plessis) (1740 in Languedoc - 14 October 1773), was a French salonist.

Biography

Born the daughter of Louis François Armand de Vignerot du Plessis, Duke of Richelieu, and Princess Élisabeth Sophie de Lorraine (daughter of Joseph, Count of Harcourt), a French prince étranger, she was raised with her paternal aunt in a Benedictine convent. In 1755 she was married to Don Casimir Pignatelli, Count of Egmont, Prince de Gavre (1727-1801), son of Don Procopio Pignatelli d'Egmont, Duke of Bisaccia, Prince de Gavre (1703-1743) and his wife, Henriette Julie de Durfort (1696-1779).

She hosted a salon which gathered "the literary celebrities of the days", including Voltaire and Rousseau, and was a center of opposition to Madame du Barry. Through her close friendship with the Swedish ambassador to France, Ulrik Scheffer, she came to know the future Gustav III of Sweden during his visit to Paris in 1771. Thereafter she maintained a correspondence with him during his reign. She advised him to "repress the strife of the raging parties", advocated a "monarchy restrained by laws" and greeted his coup of 1772 with joy, especially its non-bloody character. She called Gustav III "The hero of my heart", and it is considered likely that she had influence "upon the enlightened, humanistic, in many ways liberated direction of the early reign of Gustav III".

Rousseau visited her at her Château de Braine in 1771, where he recited his autobiographical work Confessions.

Ancestry

References

Sources 
  Marie-Célestine-Amélie-de Segur Armaille, Comtesse d', La comtesse d'Egmont, fille du maréchal de Richelieu, 1740-1773. D'après ses lettres inédites à Gustave III, Perrin et Cie, 1890.
 Jean-Claude Hauc, "Septimanie d'Egmont, princesse républicaine" in Trois femmes des Lumières, Les Editions de Paris, 2010.
 Nordisk familjebok / Uggleupplagan. 6. Degeberg - Egyptolog  
 Beth Hennings, Grevinnan d'Egmont och Gustav III (1920)

1740 births
1773 deaths
French salon-holders
French untitled nobility
People of the Ancien Régime
18th-century French people